Finnish-South African relations are foreign relations between Finland and South Africa.  Diplomatic relations established May 15, 1949.  A South African legation was established in 1967 and relations were then upgraded to ambassadorial level in March 1991. Finland has an embassy in Pretoria, a general consulate in Johannesburg and a consulate in Cape Town. South Africa is accredited to Finland from its embassy in Stockholm, Sweden.

South Africa supported Finland during the Winter War and supplied 25 Gloster Gauntlets to the Finish air force. During World War II South Africa, along with other Commonwealth nations, declared war on Finland.

Finland was critical of South Africa's official policy of neutrality following Russia's 2022 invasion of Ukraine and called for South Africa to support Ukraine.

Agreements
In 2008 South Africa and Finland signed a cooperation agreement to support biosciences projects in the Southern African Development Community.

Apartheid
Finland was a strong supporter of the dismantling of Apartheid in South Africa.

Trade
Between 1925 to 1939 Finland was the largest source of imported timber for South Africa.

South Africa exports to Finland fresh and dried fruits, wine, pulp, paper, iron, steel and coal. South Africa imports telecommunication equipment, paper, board products, and machinery from Finland.

Resident diplomatic missions
 Finland has an embassy in Pretoria.
 South Africa is accredited to Finland from its embassy in Stockholm, Sweden.

See also 
 Foreign relations of Finland
 Foreign relations of South Africa
 South Africa–European Union relations

External links 
  Finnish Ministry for Foreign Affairs about relations with South Africa
  South African Department of Foreign Affairs about relations with Finland

References

 
South Africa
Bilateral relations of South Africa